CicLAvia is a nonprofit, car-free streets initiative in Los Angeles, California. The organization temporarily closes streets to motor vehicles to make them accessible to vendors and the public. It runs six times a year (once every two months) on new and repeating routes. 

The event is completely free to the public. “Based on [the Ciclovía model from Bogotá, Colombia, it’s when organizers, city and county officials close a stretch of city streets to all motorized vehicles and open up the roadway for people to bike, skate, run, stroll, ride a scooter and just enjoy the neighborhood, close up. Nothing electric is allowed except for the following: E-bikes with pedal-assist—but other e-bikes must have the throttle powered off—and motorized wheelchairs.”

Upwards of 100,000 people attend individual CicLAvia events, and it’s estimated that, cumulatively, more than 1.6 million people have attended them since 2010.

History

The First CicLAvia 
The first CicLAvia event, on October 10, 2010 opened a stretch of streets from East Hollywood through downtown Los Angeles into Boyle Heights. Over 100,000 people turned out, exceeding organizers’ expectations. The event itself was inspired by Ciclovia, a similar, annual open streets event taking place in Bogota, Colombia since 1974.

10-year anniversary 
CicLAvia celebrated 10 years of Los Angeles events on October 10, 2021. The route included DTLA and surrounding neighborhoods. The birthday event celebrated over a decade of open streets in which people could bike, skate, run, walk, skateboard, and spectate. In the event's 10-year history, there have been 35 CicLAvias, more than 1.8 million participants (averaging 53,000 participants at each event), and nearly 226 miles of open streets in L.A. County.

Route history 
Over 30 subsequent CicLAvia events have taken place in communities across Los Angeles County, usually covering a 5-10 mile stretch of city streets. Some of the locations used are Pasadena, South Los Angeles, Culver City, Thai Town and West Hollywood. In 2013, CicLAvia—To the Sea ran 15 miles from downtown Los Angeles to Venice Beach.

List of CicLAvia routes
Past and future CicLAvia routes:

 2015-03-22: The Valley
 2015-05-31: Pasadena
 2015-08-09: Culver City Meets Venice 
 2015-10-18: Heart of LA
 2016-03-06: The Valley
 2016-05-15: Southeast Cities
 2016-08-14: Iconic Wilshire Boulevard
 2016-10-16: Heart of LA
 2017-03-27: Culver City Meets Venice
 2017-06–11: Glendale Meets Atwater Village
 2017-08-13: San Pedro Meets Wilmington
 2017-10-08: Heart of LA
 2017-12-10: Iconic Wilshire Boulevard 
 2018-04-22: Heart of the Foothills
 2018-06-24: The Valley
 2018-09-30: LA Phil 100 x CicLAvia: Celebrate LA!
 2018-12-02: Heart of LA
 2019-03-03: Culver City Meets Mar Vista + Palms
 2019-04-28: Wilmington
 2019-06-30: Mid City Meets Pico-Union
 2019-08-18: Meet the Hollywoods
 2019-10-06: Heart of LA
 2019-12-09: The Valley
 2020-02-23: South LA
 2021-08-15: Wilmington 
 2021–10-10: Heart of LA
 2021-12-05: South LA
 2022-07-10: South LA
 2022-08-21: Meet the Hollywoods
 2022-10-09: Heart of LA
 2022-12-04: SouthLA
 2023-02-26: CicLAvia—The Valley
 2023-04-16: CicLAvia—Mid City meets Pico Union
 2023-05-21: CicLAmini—Watts
 2023-06-18: CicLAvia—South LA (Vermont Ave.)
 2023-08-20: CicLAvia—Koreatown meets Hollywood
 2023-09-17: CicLAmini—North Hollywood
 2023-10-15: CicLAvia—Heart of LA
 2023-12-3: CicLAvia—South LA (Leimert Park meets Historic South Central)

Event

Details 
Local businesses often get involved with the event, offering deals and specials along the route to take advantage of the increase in activity. At “hubs” throughout each route, there are typically food trucks, climbing walls, arts and crafts, and other games.

Partners 

Los Angeles Metro provides funding to CicLAvia to support event planning, coordination, promotion, and other costs as part of a larger funding package for car-free streets. Other organizations work with CicLAvia for specific events, like the LA Phil and UCLA.

Impact 

The goal of the nonprofit is to encourage public health, mass transit and vibrant use of public space through car-free street events. In addition to fostering bicycling and walking, LA Metro staff report that CicLAvia events coincide with a 10% or greater increase in rail ridership and system-wide increases in sales of day passes. RAND Corporation researchers evaluated the physical activity at a CicLAvia event, reporting that 45% of participants would have otherwise been sedentary, and recommending CicLAvia increase event frequency.

A UCLA study found a reduction in local crime by 40%, as well as additional benefits for local businesses along the route, which see sales increase anywhere from 10% to 57% on event days. A separate study measured the air quality impacts of a CicLAvia event in downtown Los Angeles, finding a substantial decrease in particulate matter and ultrafine particles along and near the route.

The event has also renewed calls to turn the intersection and portion of Hollywood Boulevard in front of the Hollywood & Highland Center into a public plaza, similar to Times Square.

See also 
 Critical Mass
 List of Los Angeles bike paths

References

External links 

 CicLAvia Official Website

Cycling events in the United States
Transportation in Los Angeles County, California
Cycling in Los Angeles
Sports in Los Angeles
Events in Los Angeles
Festivals in Los Angeles
Bike paths in California
2010 establishments in the United States
Open-streets events